The Cliff Spring Trail is a  hiking trail located on the North Rim of the Grand Canyon National Park, located in the U.S. state of Arizona. It is a spot used for Hiking. 

It is located at

See also
 The Grand Canyon
 List of trails in Grand Canyon National Park

External links

 Grand Canyon National Park, Official site
 Arizona Hiking
 OpenStreetMap
 OpenStreetMap GPX download

Grand Canyon, North Rim
Grand Canyon, Walhalla Plateau
Hiking trails in Grand Canyon National Park